John Halcomb (later Halcombe, 1790 –  3 November 1852) was an English serjeant-at-law, and a Conservative Member of Parliament (MP) for Dover between 1833 and 1835. Of several written works, his most significant was A Practical Treatise of Passing Private Bills through both Houses of Parliament (1836).

Halcomb, who was later known as Halcombe, married Margaret Birch. Their fifth child, Arthur Halcombe, went to New Zealand as an immigration agent under William Fox. The daughter of his brother William, Sarah Holcomb, was the wife of William Fox.

References

External links 
 

1790 births
1852 deaths
Conservative Party (UK) MPs for English constituencies
Serjeants-at-law (England)
UK MPs 1832–1835
Tory MPs (pre-1834)
Members of the Parliament of the United Kingdom for Dover
19th-century English lawyers